Sun Haven Studios was a movie company located on Weedon Island in St. Petersburg, Florida during the early 1930s. It produced only 3 movies: Playthings of Desire (1933), Hired Wife (1934) and Chloe (1934). All of the lead actors were minor players from Hollywood. 

In addition to these three productions, the company had several adaptations from popular novels in development, including The Mad Dancer, Ermine and Rhinestones, Wings of Pride, Her Indiscretion and Madonnas and Men. Buster Keaton did come to the studios to work on revitalizing his career but left before making any movies. The studio was closed shortly thereafter.

In late 1933, pulp writer Eustace L. Adams, who wintered in the St. Petersburg area, was working on a script for the Sun Haven film Gambler's Throw, based on his 1930 Argosy magazine serial.

References

Mass media companies established in 1933
Mass media companies disestablished in 1934
Defunct American film studios
Film production companies of the United States
1933 establishments in Florida
1934 disestablishments in Florida